Ditrigona inconspicua is a moth in the family Drepanidae. It was described by John Henry Leech in 1898. It is found in western China.

The wingspan is 16.5 mm. The costa of the forewings has some dark brown scales at the base. The fasciae are dark brownish grey and equally spaced, consisting of four diffusely marked lunulate fasciae proximal to the end of the cell, three more lunulate fasciae distal to the end of the cell and a narrow terminal fascia. The hindwings are as the forewings.

References

Moths described in 1898
Drepaninae
Moths of Asia